The 2014 NatWest t20 Blast was the first season of the NatWest t20 Blast, the English Twenty20 cricket competition. The competition ran from 16 May 2014 until Finals Day at Edgbaston on 23 August, which was won by Birmingham Bears. The competition replaced the Friends Life t20 competition. With attendance figures over 700,000, it was the most attended season of T20 cricket in England since the format began in 2003.

Format
The 18 teams were divided into two groups of nine. In the style of a round-robin tournament, each team played six other teams in their group both home and away. The other two teams were faced just once. The top four teams from each group qualified for the knockout stage: a three-round single-elimination tournament. The winner of each group had a home match in the quarter-finals against the fourth team from the other group. The runners-up from each group played at home against the third placed team from the other group. The semi-finals were a free draw from all the qualified teams. Finals Day will be again be held at Edgbaston.

Teams

North Division

Table

Results

Fixtures

May

June

July

South Division

Table

Results

Fixtures

May

June

July

Knockout stage

Quarter-finals

Semifinals

Final

Statistics

Highest team totals
The following table lists the five highest team scores in the season.

Most runs
The top five highest run scorers (total runs) in the season are included in this table.

Highest scores
This table contains the top five highest scores of the season made by a batsman in a single innings.

Most wickets
The following table contains the five leading wicket-takers of the season.

Best bowling figures
This table lists the top five players with the best bowling figures in the season.

See also
2014 Royal London One-Day Cup
 2014 County Championship

References

External links
Tournament Site – Cricinfo

NatWest t20 Blast
NatWest t20 Blast
NatWest t20 Blast
2014
NatWest t20 Blast